David W. Anthony is an American anthropologist who is Professor Emeritus of Anthropology at Hartwick College. He specializes in Indo-European migrations, and is a proponent of the Kurgan hypothesis. Anthony is well known for his award-winning book The Horse, the Wheel, and Language (2007).

Career 

Anthony received a Ph.D. in anthropology from the University of Pennsylvania.

Anthony has been a Professor of Anthropology at Hartwick College since 1987. While at Hartwick, he was also the curator of Anthropology for the Yager Museum of Art & Culture on the campus of Hartwick College in Oneonta, New York. According to Princeton University Press, "he has conducted extensive archaeological fieldwork in Ukraine, Russia, and Kazakhstan." Anthony has been Archaeology Editor of the Journal of Indo-European Studies.

One of his areas of research has been the domestication of the horse. In 2019, his work was featured in an episode of Nova that discussed the theories of how this process occurred.

 Mediated works 
According to the uncurated ResearchGate website, Anthony has published at least 54 research articles.

 Bibliography 
The books of Anthony include:
 The Horse, the Wheel and Language: How Bronze-Age Riders from the Eurasian Steppes Shaped the Modern World (2007)
 The Lost World Of Old Europe: The Danube Valley, 5000 - 3500 BC (2009)
 A Bronze Age Landscape in the Russian Steppes: The Samara Valley Project (2016, co-editor)

 Filmography 
Anthony has appeared as a relator of history in works such as:
 How the Silk Road Made the World (2019, NHNZ)
 First Horse Warriors'' (2019, NOVA)

See also
 Edgar C. Polomé
 J. P. Mallory

References 

American anthropologists
American male non-fiction writers
American historians
University of Pennsylvania School of Arts and Sciences alumni
Hartwick College faculty
Living people

Year of birth missing (living people)